The 1983 Southwest Texas State Bobcats football team was an American football team that represented Southwest Texas State University (now known as Texas State University) during the 1983 NCAA Division II football season as a member of the Lone Star Conference (LSC). In their first year under head coach John O'Hara, the team compiled an overall record of 9–2, with a mark of 6–1 in conference play, finished as LSC co-champion, and with a loss against  in the NCAA Division II Quarterfinals.

Schedule

References

Southwest Texas State
Texas State Bobcats football seasons
Lone Star Conference football champion seasons
Southwest Texas State Bobcats football